The United States Veterans' Affairs Subcommittee on Disability Assistance and Memorial Affairs is one of the four subcommittees within the House Veterans' Affairs Committee.

Jurisdiction
From the House Rules:
Subcommittee on Disability Assistance and Memorial Affairs, which shall have legislative, oversight and investigative jurisdiction over compensation; general and special pensions of all the wars of the United States; life insurance issued by the Government on account of service in the Armed Forces; cemeteries of the United States in which veterans of any war or conflict are or may be buried, whether in the United States or abroad, except cemeteries administered by the Secretary of the Interior; burial benefits; the Board of Veterans’ Appeals; and the Court of Appeals for Veterans’ Claims.

Members, 117th Congress

Historical membership rosters

115th Congress

116th Congress

References

External links
Subcommittee page

Veterans' Affairs Disability